Levally Lough is a freshwater lake in the west of Ireland. It is located in County Mayo near Lough Conn.

Geography and natural history
The lake is a pike fishing destination.

See also
List of loughs in Ireland

References

Levally